WKHJ (104.5 FM) is an Adult Contemporary formatted broadcast radio station. The station is licensed to Mountain Lake Park, Maryland and serves Garrett County and Western Maryland in Maryland and Preston County and the Potomac Highlands in West Virginia in the United States. WKHJ is owned by Broadcast Communications, Inc. and operated under their Broadcast Communications II, Inc. licensee.

That station shares studios with sister stations WKTQ, WKTZ-FM, and WMSG at 407 Lothian Street in Loch Lynn Heights, near Oakland.

See also
WKHJ's Studios on Google StreetView

References

External links
104.5 KHJ Online

1991 establishments in Maryland
Mainstream adult contemporary radio stations in the United States
Radio stations established in 1991
KHJ